Oleg Nikolayevich Smolin (born 10 February 1952, the village Poludino, North Kazakhstan Region) is a Soviet and Russian politician and philosopher, a specialist in the philosophy of politics and social philosophy. State Duma deputy, member of the Communist Party faction, First Deputy Chairman of the Education Committee of the State Duma. Doctor of Philosophy, corresponding member of Russian Academy of Education. President of the Society Znanie of Russia. Chairman of the All-Russian Public Movement Education for All.

He is almost blind from birth.

First Vice-President of the Russian Paralympic Committee, the vice-president of the All-Russian Society for the Blind (VOS), an honorary member of the All-Russian Society for the Disabled.

Cavalier of the Golden Honorary sign Public Recognition. Order of the Inter-Parliamentary Assembly of States —  members of the Commonwealth of Independent States Commonwealth.

He was the only member of the State Duma who voted against the recognition of the separatist Lugansk People's Republic. However, he later stated he made a mistake when casting his vote, and asked to correct the vote tally. He fully supports the 2022 Russian invasion of Ukraine, and called for the "demilitarization and denazification" of Ukraine.

References

External links
 Официальный сайт Олега Смолина
 Страница на сайте ГД РФ
 Страница на сайте КПРФ

1952 births
Living people
People from North Kazakhstan Region
Russian philosophers
Academicians of the Russian Academy of Education
Members of the Federation Council of Russia (1994–1996)
Communist Party of the Soviet Union members
Communist Party of the Russian Federation members
Russian blind people
Blind politicians
21st-century Russian politicians
Second convocation members of the State Duma (Russian Federation)
Third convocation members of the State Duma (Russian Federation)
Fourth convocation members of the State Duma (Russian Federation)
Fifth convocation members of the State Duma (Russian Federation)
Sixth convocation members of the State Duma (Russian Federation)
Seventh convocation members of the State Duma (Russian Federation)
Eighth convocation members of the State Duma (Russian Federation)